Nancy E Levinger is a chemistry professor at Colorado State University. She has a variety of research interests including "Ultrafast laser spectroscopy for dynamics of molecules and assemblies in the condensed phase" In addition to her research, she has received many awards for her exemplary teaching and mentorship.

Education 
Dr. Levinger earned bachelor of arts degrees in integrated science and physics at Northwestern University in 1983. In 1990, she received her Ph.D in Chemical Physics at University of Colorado working with Prof. W. Carl Lineberger. From 1990 to 1992 she was a National Science Foundation postdoctoral fellow in the lab of Paul F. Barbara at the University of Minnesota.

Career and awards 
Dr. Levinger has been a faculty member at Colorado State University since 1992. She was promoted from assistant to associate professor in 1999 and earned the rank of professor in 2005. In 2007, she earned one of the highest distinctions at Colorado State University, that of University Distinguished Teaching Scholar.

References

External links 
 

Science teachers
Scientists from Colorado
Year of birth missing (living people)
Living people
Northwestern University alumni
Colorado State University faculty